Mitchell Thomas Duke (born 18 January 1991) is an Australian international soccer player who plays for Machida Zelvia in the J2 League. Duke was born in Liverpool, New South Wales and played youth soccer with Paramatta Eagles before starting his professional career with Central Coast Mariners. He joined J-League side Shimizu S-Pulse and Fagiano Okayama in 2015 and 2021 respectively.

He represented Australia at the 2022 FIFA World Cup, and Australia Olympic at the 2020 Summer Olympics.

Early life
Duke was born in Liverpool, in Sydney's south-west. He attended All Saints Catholic College, Liverpool and All Saints Catholic Senior College Casula.

Playing career

Club
He began his career with Parramatta Eagles before moving into the Central Coast Mariners' youth team. On 9 February 2011, Duke made his senior debut for the Mariners and also scored his first goal in a 3–1 win over Gold Coast United.

On 24 January 2012 it was announced he had signed his first senior contract signing a two-year contract with Central Coast Mariners.

In August 2013, Duke had a two-week trial with English Premier League side West Ham United.

In the 2012/13 season, Duke scored 6 goals from 21 games. In the 2013/14 season, he wasn't as prolific, scoring 3 goals in 29 games. In the 2014/15 season, he had 3 goals from 15 games. The decrease in goals can be attributed to Duke being played increasingly on the right wing by coach Phil Moss rather than the centre forward position he began his career playing.

On 9 February 2015, Duke announced that he was flying to Japan to complete a move to Shimizu S-Pulse. In April 2016, Duke suffered an anterior cruciate ligament injury, ruling him out of football for at least six months.

Duke left Shimizu in December 2018, after 4 seasons with the club.

On 25 January 2019, Mitchell Duke announced that he had moved back home and signed with Western Sydney Wanderers FC and captained the club.

On 22 August 2020, Duke signed a 2-year deal with Al-Taawoun. He scored the winning goal against Al-Duhail in a AFC Champions League group stage fixture on 25 September 2020 but fell out of favour with the club leadership shortly after, having moved from his forward position to the wing. On 1 February 2021, Duke returned to Australia and signed for his former club Western Sydney Wanderers on loan for the remainder of the 2020–21 A-League season.

On 5 August 2021, Duke joined Fagiano Okayama.

On 30 December 2022, it was announced that Duke had officially transferred to Machida Zelvia for the upcoming 2023 J2 League season.

International
Duke was included in the Australian national team in July 2013, for the 2013 EAFF East Asian Cup. Duke made his international tournament debut against South Korea in the first match of the tournament, in a draw. He scored his first international goal in the next match, a 3–2 loss to Japan. Duke scored again in the following match which Australia lost 4–3 to China.

7 September 2013, Duke next played for the Socceroos in a 0–6 friendly loss to Brazil, at Estadio Nacional Mane Garrincha in Brasília. Mitch came on as a second half substitute for Josh Kennedy in the 78th minute.

Duke qualified for the Tokyo 2020 Olympics. He was included in the Olyroos Olympic squad. They defeated Argentina in their first group match but, unable to win another match, they never were in contention for a medal.

He featured in Australia's team in the 2022 FIFA World Cup in Qatar. In the team's second match against Tunisia on 26 November 2022, he scored the only goal in a 1–0 win, Australia's first World Cup win since 2010.

Career statistics

Club
.

International

Statistics accurate as of match played 26 November 2022.

International goals

Honours

Club
Central Coast Mariners

A-League Championship: 2012–2013

See also
List of Central Coast Mariners FC players

References

External links
 
 
 
 
 Profile at Shimizu S-Pulse 

1991 births
Living people
Soccer players from Sydney
Association football forwards
Australian soccer players
Australian expatriate soccer players
Australia international soccer players
Central Coast Mariners FC players
Blacktown City FC players
Shimizu S-Pulse players
Western Sydney Wanderers FC players
Al-Taawoun FC players
Fagiano Okayama players
FC Machida Zelvia players
A-League Men players
J1 League players
J2 League players
Saudi Professional League players
Expatriate footballers in Japan
Expatriate footballers in Saudi Arabia
Australian expatriate sportspeople in Japan
Australian expatriate sportspeople in Saudi Arabia
Footballers at the 2020 Summer Olympics
Olympic soccer players of Australia
Sportsmen from New South Wales
2022 FIFA World Cup players